Westin Hotels & Resorts is an American upscale hotel chain owned by Marriott International. , the Westin Brand has 226 properties with 82,608 rooms in multiple countries in addition to 58 hotels with 15,741 rooms in the pipeline.

History

Western Hotels

In 1930, Severt W. Thurston and Frank Dupar of Seattle, Washington met unexpectedly during breakfast at the coffee shop of the Commercial Hotel in Yakima, Washington. The competing hotel owners decided to form a management company to handle all their properties, and help deal with the crippling effects of the ongoing Great Depression. The men invited Peter and Adolph Schmidt, who operated five hotels in the Puget Sound area, to join them, and together they established Western Hotels. The chain consisted of 17 properties – 16 in Washington and one in Boise, Idaho. Its headquarters and executive offices were located in its flagship property, the New Washington Plaza Hotel in Seattle (now The Westin Seattle).

Western Hotels expanded to Vancouver, British Columbia and Portland, Oregon in 1931, to Alaska in 1939, and then to California in 1941, assuming management of the Sir Francis Drake Hotel the day after Pearl Harbor was bombed. Western added properties in Utah in 1949 and Montana in 1950.

Western Hotels executive Edward Carlson convinced Victor "Trader Vic" Bergeron to open his first franchised Trader Vic's location in the chain's Benjamin Franklin Hotel in Seattle in 1949. Originally a small bar named The Outrigger, it was expanded into a full restaurant in 1954 and renamed Trader Vic's in 1960. Due to the restaurant's success, Bergeron worked with Western Hotels to open Trader Vic's locations in a number of its hotels.

In 1955, Western Hotels assumed management of the landmark Olympic Hotel in Seattle, the headquarters and executive offices were moved from the New Washington Plaza Hotel to a newly-decorated suite of offices on the 12th floor of the Olympic, in celebration of the chain's 25th anniversary.

Western Hotels expanded to Hawaii in 1956, assuming management of the Hawaiian Village Hotel, built by Henry J. Kaiser.

Early management developed each property individually. After more than two decades of rapid growth, many of its properties were merged into a single corporate structure in 1958, focusing on bringing the hotels together under a common chain identity. Also in 1958, Western Hotels assumed management of three hotels in Guatemala, its first properties outside the US and Canada. Western opened its first hotel in Mexico in 1961. In March of that same year, they opened the first hotel to be both constructed and owned by the chain, The Bayshore Inn in Vancouver.

Edward Carlson became President of the chain in 1960 and is credited with bringing the Century 21 Exposition to Seattle in 1962. Carlson's own napkin sketch of a tower with a revolving restaurant on top, inspired by his visit to the Stuttgart TV Tower, was the origin of the Space Needle. The chain managed the restaurant atop the Space Needle from its opening until 1982.  Western Hotels also managed a floating hotel aboard the ocean liner , docked in Seattle harbor during the fair.

Western International Hotels

The company was renamed Western International Hotels in January 1963, to reflect its growth outside the US. That same year, the company went public.

From November 1, 1965, to 1970, Western International had an agreement with Hotel Corporation of America (today known as Sonesta), under which all 72 hotels of the two chains were jointly marketed as HCA and Western Hotels.

From 1968 to 1973, Western International had a similar joint marketing agreement with UK-based Trust House Hotels.

In 1970, Western International was acquired by UAL Corporation, with Edward Carlson becoming president and CEO of UAL, Inc and United Airlines.

Western International bought New York's iconic Plaza Hotel in 1975 for $25 million.

Westin Hotels

On January 5, 1981, the company changed its name again to Westin Hotels (a contraction of the words Western International). The chain's flagship Washington Plaza Hotel in Seattle was the first property to be rebranded, becoming The Westin Hotel on September 1, 1981. That same year, Westin opened a new corporate headquarters directly across the street in the Westin Building, which shared a parking garage with the hotel.

In 1987, UAL chairman Richard Ferris announced a plan to reorganize UAL as Allegis Corporation, a travel conglomerate based around United Airlines, Hertz Rent a Car, Hilton International Hotels, and Westin and linked by Apollo. This strategy failed, however, and Allegis sold Westin in 1988 to the Japanese Aoki Corporation for $1.35 billion. Aoki immediately sold the Plaza Hotel to Donald Trump for $390 million.

In 1994, Aoki agreed to sell Westin to real estate investment firm Starwood Capital Group (parent of Starwood) and Goldman Sachs at an enormous loss, for $561 million, but by the time the sale closed in May 1995, the buyers had negotiated the price down to $537 million. In 1998, Starwood assumed full ownership of the company.

In 2016, Marriott International acquired Starwood, becoming the world's largest hotel company.

Amenities
Westin was the first hotel chain to introduce guest credit cards (in 1946), 24-hour room service (1969), and personal voice mail in each room (1991).

In 1999, Westin began selling the Heavenly Bed mattresses featured in Westin properties, and manufactured by Simmons Bedding Company, to the general public. In 2005, Westin partnered with Nordstrom, which carried the mattresses and bedding in its stores. In 2011, Westin began selling the Heavenly mattresses and bedding at Pottery Barn stores.

Accommodations

Notable hotels
 The Westin Dhaka
 The Westin Seattle – The first and original Westin branded hotel, iconic cylindrical towers scaling the Seattle skyline
 The Westin Charlotte
 The Westin Bonaventure Hotel & Suites Los Angeles 
 Moana Surfrider, A Westin Resort & Spa 
 The Westin Peachtree Plaza Atlanta 
 The Westin Book Cadillac Detroit 
 The Westin Nova Scotian – Halifax, Nova Scotia
 The Westin Singapore – has the highest hotel lobby in Singapore 
 The Westin St. Francis – San Francisco hotel on Union Square
 The Westin Palace Madrid 
 The Westin San Jose – Formerly the Saint Claire and Hyatt Saint Claire. 
 The Westin Hamburg – opened in 2016 and located in Hamburg's Elbphilharmonie concert hall
 The Westin Hotel in downtown Minneapolis has been sold. 
 Walt Disney World Swan-Connected with the Walt Disney World Dolphin at Walt Disney World
 The Westin Dubai Mina Seyahi Beach Resort and Marina – opened in 2008

References

 
Hotel chains
Marriott International brands
American companies established in 1930
Hotels established in 1930
Companies based in Stamford, Connecticut
American brands